Ana Rodrigues (died 1593), was a Brazilian settler, one of the first victims of the Portuguese Inquisition. She emigrated from Portugal to Bahia in Brazil with her spouse in 1557. In 1591, she was accused of having led her family into practicing Judaism in a secret synagogue. She was deported to Lisbon, where she was judged guilty as a heretic leader and sentenced to death. She died in prison in 1593, however, and her image was burned in public as an effigy in 1604.

References

 Lipiner, E. Santo Ofício de Lisboa: confissões da Bahia. São Paulo: Companhia das Letras, 1997

1593 deaths
16th-century Brazilian people
People executed by the Portuguese Inquisition
16th-century Brazilian women
Women sentenced to death